Zajko Zeba (born 22 May 1983) is a Bosnian retired footballer. He was part of the Bosnia and Herzegovina national team from 2005 to 2007.

For a short period during 2018, Zeba worked as a football manager, holding the role of assistant manager at Željezničar and then as a coach of the youth team at the same club.

Club career
Born in Sarajevo, Zeba started his career at hometown club Željezničar. He played for the youth sides, but never got an opportunity to play for the first team, so he moved to Olimpik. His performances produced interest from stronger teams in Bosnia and Herzegovina and resulted in a transfer to Brotnjo. In 2004, Željezničar officials brought Zeba back to his childhood club on loan, but after only several months, as a result of new disagreements, he signed a contract with Zrinjski Mostar.

His first foreign club was Slovenian PrvaLiga club Maribor. Then, he went to the Russian Football National League where he played for KAMAZ Naberezhnye Chelny. After a short period in Alania Vladikavkaz, Zeba came back to Željezničar, the club in which he had started his football career. In his third spell with Željezničar, Zeba won one league title and two cups and was named the 2011–12 Bosnian Premier League Player of the Season. In December 2012, he left Željezničar and went to RNK Split.

After coming back to Bosnia in early 2015, and signing with Sloboda Tuzla, he became the team captain the following season, and helped the team in winning the autumn part of the 2015–16 Bosnian Premier League season. At the end of the season, Zeba was named as the best player of the 2015–16 season in the Bosnian Premier League. In November 2016, he returned to Željezničar but he couldn't play for the club until 2017. In 2018, he won the Bosnian Cup with Željezničar and shortly after he retired at the age of 34.

On 20 December 2018, Zeba came out of retirement and for the third time in his career signed with Olimpik. He scored his first goal after coming back to Olimpik on 9 March 2019, in a 1–0 away win against Igman Konjic. On 26 May 2020, the 2019–20 First League of FBiH season ended abruptly due to the ongoing COVID-19 pandemic in Bosnia and Herzegovina and, by default, Zeba with Olimpik were crowned league champions and got promoted back to the Bosnian Premier League. He terminated his contract with the club on 22 September 2020.

One day after leaving Olimpik, on 23 September, Zeba signed with Igman Konjic. He made his debut only four days later, on 27 September, in a league match against Vis Simm-Bau. Zeba scored his first for Igman in a league game against Zvijezda Gradačac on 24 October 2020.

International
His final international was a September 2007 European Championship qualification against Moldova.

Managerial career

Željezničar
In June 2018, after announcing his retirement, Zeba was appointed as an assistant manager at Željezničar. On 29 October 2018, after a string of poor results, it was announced that Zeba was dismissed of his position of assistant, while a month later, on 21 November, was named as a coach of the youth selections at the club.

In December 2018, he left Željezničar after coming out of retirement and signing with Olimpik.

Career statistics

Club

International

Honours
Zrinjski Mostar 
Bosnian Premier League: 2004–05

Željezničar  
Bosnian Premier League: 2011–12
Bosnian Cup: 2010–11, 2011–12, 2017–18

Olimpik  
First League of FBiH: 2019–20

Individual
Awards
Bosnian Premier League Player of the Season: 2011–12, 2015–16

References

External links
Zajko Zeba at Sofascore

1983 births
Living people
Footballers from Sarajevo
Association football midfielders
Bosnia and Herzegovina footballers
Bosnia and Herzegovina international footballers
FK Olimpik players
NK Brotnjo players
FK Željezničar Sarajevo players
HŠK Zrinjski Mostar players
NK Maribor players
FC KAMAZ Naberezhnye Chelny players
FC Spartak Vladikavkaz players
RNK Split players
NK Olimpija Ljubljana (2005) players
KF Shkëndija players
FK Sloboda Tuzla players
FK Igman Konjic players
First League of the Federation of Bosnia and Herzegovina players
Premier League of Bosnia and Herzegovina players
Slovenian PrvaLiga players
Russian First League players
Croatian Football League players
Macedonian First Football League players
Bosnia and Herzegovina expatriate footballers
Expatriate footballers in Slovenia
Bosnia and Herzegovina expatriate sportspeople in Slovenia
Expatriate footballers in Russia
Bosnia and Herzegovina expatriate sportspeople in Russia
Expatriate footballers in Croatia
Bosnia and Herzegovina expatriate sportspeople in Croatia
Expatriate footballers in North Macedonia
Bosnia and Herzegovina expatriate sportspeople in North Macedonia